Isaac Volney Baker Jr. (August 15, 1843 Comstock's Landing, Fort Ann, Washington County, New York – December 14, 1912 Hudson Falls, Washington Co., NY) was an American politician from New York.

Life
He was the son of Isaac V. Baker (1813–1894) and Laura Daley (Comstock) Baker (1819–1877). He attended North Granville Academy, and Brooklyn Polytechnic and Collegiate Institute. Then he engaged in mercantile and agricultural pursuits, especially in breeding Merino sheep.

On September 14, 1865, he married Laura Demis Clark (1844–1930), and they had several children.

He was a member of the New York State Assembly (Washington Co., 2nd D.) in 1869, 1870 and 1871; of the New York State Senate (12th D.) in 1872 and 1873; again of the State Assembly in 1877; and again of the State Senate (16th D.) in 1880 and 1881.

He was New York Superintendent of State Prisons from 1882 to 1887. He was New York State Railroad Commissioner from 1887 to 1892.

He died of pneumonia on December 14, 1912 in Hudson Falls, New York at age 69.

He was buried at the Baker Cemetery in Fort Ann.

References

Sources
 The New York Civil List compiled by Franklin Benjamin Hough, Stephen C. Hutchins and Edgar Albert Werner (1870; pg. 511 and 513)
 THE STATE PRISONS in NYT on March 26, 1882
 TRICKY GOVERNOR HILL in NYT on April 21, 1887

External links

1843 births
1912 deaths
Republican Party New York (state) state senators
People from Fort Ann, New York
Deaths from pneumonia in New York (state)
Republican Party members of the New York State Assembly
New York Superintendents of State Prisons
19th-century American politicians